Camponotus sansabeanus is a species of ant in the family Formicidae.

References

Further reading

 Arnett, Ross H. (2000). American Insects: A Handbook of the Insects of America North of Mexico. CRC Press.

External links

 NCBI Taxonomy Browser, Camponotus sansabeanus

sansabeanus
Insects described in 1866

aracarbrotasi